Peter Burridge (born 30 December 1933 in Harlow) is an English former footballer who played as an inside forward in the 1950s and 1960s.

Playing career
He began his career with Barnet and from there was signed by Leyton Orient of the Football League in 1958–59. He only played a handful of games for the club before a successful transfer to Millwall in 1960. In the 1960–61 season he scored 34 goals for the club, and this was followed the next season with 22 goals which helped Millwall to the League title, following which he was sold to Crystal Palace for £10,000, signing in June 1962.

He played over 100 league games for Palace, and scored a league hat-trick for them versus Wrexham on 15 April 1963. In season 1963–64 Palace were promoted to the second tier and Burridge played in all but two games, scoring 20 goals, making him joint (League) top-scorer with Cliff Holton. In November 1965, he moved to Charlton Athletic before returning to non-League football with Bedford Town.

References

External links

Peter Burridge at holmesdale.net

1933 births
Sportspeople from Harlow
Association football inside forwards
English Football League players
Barnet F.C. players
Leyton Orient F.C. players
Millwall F.C. players
Crystal Palace F.C. players
Charlton Athletic F.C. players
Bedford Town F.C. players
Living people
English footballers